A quadrapod is a machine (robot) with 
four legs for locomotion, for example walking machines.

See also
 Quadruped, an animal (especially mammal) with four legs (limbs) for locomotion.

21st-century robots